Mihovil Španja (born 20 April 1984) is a retired Croatian Paralympic swimmer.

In 2021, the Croatian Olympic Committee named Španja the Croatian Paralympic Athlete of the Decade.

References

External links
 

1984 births
Living people
Sportspeople from Dubrovnik
Croatian male freestyle swimmers
Swimmers at the 2000 Summer Paralympics
Swimmers at the 2004 Summer Paralympics
Swimmers at the 2008 Summer Paralympics
Swimmers at the 2012 Summer Paralympics
Paralympic bronze medalists for Croatia
S7-classified Paralympic swimmers
Medalists at the 2004 Summer Paralympics
Medalists at the 2012 Summer Paralympics
Medalists at the World Para Swimming Championships
Medalists at the World Para Swimming European Championships
Paralympic medalists in swimming
Paralympic swimmers of Croatia
21st-century Croatian people